Goran Veselinovski (born September 2, 1975) is a former Macedonian professional basketball Swingman who played for Rabotnički,.

External links
 http://basketball.eurobasket.com/player/Goran_Veselinovski/FYR-Macedonia/KK_Rabotnicki_AD_Skopje/19657
 https://web.archive.org/web/20150402135328/http://bgbasket.com/en/player_logs.php?id=2119
 http://www.levskibasket.com/en/playerranks.php?id=2119&age=&gender=&m=

References

1975 births
Living people
Macedonian men's basketball players
Sportspeople from Skopje
Small forwards
Shooting guards